The 1999–2000 FA Cup (known as The FA Cup sponsored by AXA for sponsorship reasons) was the 119th staging of the FA Cup. Both the semifinals and final of the competition were played at Wembley Stadium for the last time before reconstruction work began. The competition culminated with the final between Chelsea and Aston Villa. The game was won by a goal from Chelsea's Roberto Di Matteo, giving them a 1–0 victory.

The title holders Manchester United, withdrew from the 1999–2000 competition due to their participation in the 2000 FIFA Club World Championship in South America, to take place in early 2000, thus becoming the first FA Cup winners not to defend their title. Despite this being at the request of the Football Association (FA), they received criticism from journalists and television pundits. To keep the competition running smoothly, the FA chose to draw one team from among those lower-division teams defeated in the second round to progress as "lucky losers" to the third. Darlington were the team drawn.

The main competition started in November 1999 for clubs from the Football League and Premiership.

Calendar

 Manchester United, who were the winners the previous season, did not enter.

First round proper

This round is the first in which teams from the second Division and Third Division compete with non-League teams.
Ties were played over the weekend of 30 and 31 October 1999.
Replays were played on 8, 9 and 10 November 1999.

‡ - Oxford City's replay with Wycombe Wanderers was abandoned after extra time due to a fire within the stadium. The score was 1–1.

Second round proper

Ties were played over the weekend of 20 and 21 November 1999.
Replays were played on 30 November 1999.

 = Darlington advanced as lucky losers

Third round proper

This round marked the first time First Division and Premier League (top-flight) teams played.
Matches were played on the weekend of 11 and 12 December 1999.
Replays were played on 21 and 22 December 1999.

Fourth round proper

Ties played on weekend of 8 and 9 January 2000.
Replays played on 18 and 19 January 2000.

Fifth round proper

Ties played on weekend of 29 and 30 January 2000.
The shock result of the round came when Division Two Gillingham (who had yet to play in the top two divisions) defeated Premier League side Sheffield Wednesday 3–1.

Sixth round proper

Semi-finals

Aston Villa booked their first FA Cup final appearance since 1957 by beating Bolton Wanderers on penalties after a goalless draw, while Chelsea reached their first final after just three years with a narrow 2–1 win over Newcastle United (who had been finalists in the previous two seasons).

Aston Villa win 4–1 on penalties. Steve Stone, Lee Hendrie, Gareth Barry Dion Dublin all scored for Aston Villa. Dean Holdsworth scored for Bolton.

Final

The 2000 FA Cup final was contested between Chelsea and Aston Villa at Wembley Stadium, with Chelsea coming out 1-0 winners. Roberto Di Matteo scored the winning goal 17 minutes from the end, three years after he had opened the scoring within the first minute of Chelsea's last FA Cup final win. This was Villa's first FA Cup final for 43 years.

Media coverage
In the United Kingdom, ITV were the free to air broadcasters for the third consecutive season while Sky Sports were the subscription broadcasters for the twelfth consecutive season.

The matches shown live on ITV Sport were: Huddersfield Town 0–2 Liverpool (R3); Arsenal 0–0 Leicester City (R4); Aston Villa 3–2 Leeds United (R5); Tranmere Rovers 2–3 Newcastle United (QF); Bolton Wanderers 0–0 Aston Villa (SF); and Chelsea 1–0 Aston Villa (final).

References

External links
The FA website
BBC FA Cup page

 
1999
Fa
Eng